Manuel Hegen (born 23 November 1992) is a retired German footballer.

Career

Coaching career
In the June 2022, Hegen was appointed player-manager at Bezirksliga Donau/Iller side TSV Obenhausen 1920. However, after only six games in charge, Hegen decided to resign on 28 September 2022.

References

External links
 

German footballers
1992 births
Living people
VfB Stuttgart II players
SG Sonnenhof Großaspach players
SSV Ulm 1846 players
3. Liga players
Association football defenders
Sportspeople from Ulm
Footballers from Baden-Württemberg
German football managers